Pang Yao (born 27 May 1995) is a Hong Kong road and track cyclist, who most recently rode for UCI Women's Continental Team . She represented her nation as a junior on the road at the 2012 UCI Road World Championships and 2013 UCI Road World Championships and at the track at the 2015 UCI Track Cycling World Championships.

Major results

Track

2012
 Asian Junior Cycling Championships
1st  Scratch
1st  Team pursuit
2nd  Individual pursuit
2nd  Points race
2013
 Asian Junior Cycling Championships
1st  Points race
1st  Scratch
 2nd Scratch, ACC Track Asia Cup – Thailand Round
2014
 Hong Kong International Track Cup
1st Team pursuit (with Meng Zhaojuan, Jamie Wong and Yang Qianyu)
3rd Points race
 Asian Track Championships
2nd  Individual pursuit
3rd  Team pursuit (with Meng Zhaojuan, Jamie Wong and Yang Qianyu)
 Japan Track Cup 2
2nd Points race
3rd Omnium
 2nd Individual pursuit, Track Clubs ACC Cup
 3rd Points race, Japan Track Cup 1
2015
 1st Points race, Japan Track Cup
 Asian Track Championships
2nd  Scratch
2nd  Team pursuit (with Leung Bo Yee, Meng Zhaojuan and Yang Qianyu)
 2nd Individual pursuit, South Australian Grand Prix
2016
 Track Clubs ACC Cup
1st Team pursuit (with Leung Bo Yee, Leung Wing Yee and Yang Qianyu)
2nd Omnium
2nd Points race
 Track Asia Cup 
1st Individual pursuit
1st Team pursuit (with Leung Bo Yee, Leung Wing Yee and Meng Zhaojuan)
 3rd Omnium, ITS Melbourne DISC Grand Prix
2017
 Asian Track Championships
1st  Madison (with Meng Zhaojuan)
2nd  Team pursuit (with Diao Xiaojuan, Leung Bo Yee and Yang Qianyu)
2018
 2nd  Madison, Asian Games (with Yang Qianyu)
2019
 1st  Madison, 2020 Asian Track Cycling Championships (with Yang Qianyu)
 3rd  Scratch, 2019 Asian Track Cycling Championships

Road
Source: 

2012
 Asian Junior Cycling Championships
1st  Time trial
2nd  Road race
2013
 Asian Junior Road Championships
1st  Road race
1st  Time trial
2014
 2nd Time trial, National Road Championships
 5th Time trial, Asian Road Championships
2015
 National Road Championships
1st  Time trial
3rd Road race
2016
 3rd  Time trial, Asian Road Championships
2017
 National Road Championships
1st  Time trial
2nd Road race
 Asian Under-23 Road Championships
2nd  Road race
2nd  Time trial
2018
 National Road Championships
1st  Road race
2nd Time trial
 4th Time trial, Asian Road Championships
2019
 National Road Championships
2nd Road race
3rd Time trial
 3rd  Team time trial, Asian Road Championships

References

External links

profile at Cyclingdatabase.com

Hong Kong female cyclists
Living people
1995 births
Asian Games medalists in cycling
Cyclists at the 2018 Asian Games
Medalists at the 2018 Asian Games
Asian Games silver medalists for Hong Kong
Cyclists at the 2020 Summer Olympics
Olympic cyclists of Hong Kong